This is the discography of South Korean singer Daesung, who debuted as a member of the boy band Big Bang in 2006. After releasing multiple digital singles in his home country, his career shifted its focus to Japan, where he has currently released two Japanese studio albums, two Japanese extended plays, and several other singles and video albums.

Studio albums

Extended plays

Singles

As lead artist

As featured artist

Video albums

See also
 Big Bang discography

References

Discographies of South Korean artists
K-pop discographies